Od Mene Se Odvikavaj is a song performed by Milan Stankovic. The songwriter is Marina Tucaković and music and arrangement is by Damir Handanovic.

References

Serbian pop songs